Bill Chaffey (born 9 October 1975) is an Australian paratriathlete who won his fifth world championship in 2015. He represented Australia at the 2016 Rio Paralympics when paratriathlon made its debut at the Paralympics.

Personal
Chaffey became an incomplete paraplegic when, as a non-disabled triathlete training for an Ironman Triathlon, he was hit by a truck while on his bicycle.

Career
He competes in the PT1 (handcycle/racing wheelchair classification) (formerly TRI-1) and was TRI-1 Paratriathlon World Champion in 2009, 2011, 2012, 2013 and 2015. Chaffey's come-from-behind win over Jetze Plat was named in the International Paralympic Committee's Top 50 moments in Paralympic sport of 2013. Chaffey was nominated for IPC Athlete of the Month in September 2013.
 
In January 2013, Chaffey won the inaugural Australian Paratriathlon Championships, beating Ironman and Paralympian John Maclean and Paralympic rower Erik Horrie. He won the Men's TRI-1 classification of the 2014 Oceania Paratriathlon Championships in a world best time of 58.22, and won the 2014 ITU World Paratriathlon event in Elwood, Melbourne.

In March 2013, Chaffey set a new TRI-1 world best time for an Olympic distance triathlon. His time of 2:08:59 bettered the previous record by 5 minutes. In 2016 Chaffey again bettered that time by over 5 minutes setting a new world best time of 2:02:35.
 
In May 2013, Chaffey raced Ironman Cairns where he qualified for Ironman World Championships in Kona. He placed 2nd his classification in Kona.

Chaffey was forced to withdraw from the 2014 ITU World Triathlon Series Final in Edmonton, Alberta, Canada after breaking his hip in a training accident at home just prior to the event. In January 2015, he returned from injury to win the Oceania Paratriathlon Championships PT1 event at Penrith, New South Wales.

Chaffey won his fifth world championship at the 2015 World Championships Final in Chicago.

Chaffey competed at the 2016 Rio Paralympics Games and finished fourth in the Men's PT1 event. In preparation for the Paralympics, Chaffey stated "I just thought, this has to be mine. I have to have it...the Paralympics, A paralympic gold would not be a level step up but a greater step up, it's something I'm really putting a lot of focus on." During the Paralympics, Chaffey expressed his love of triathlon through saying "It's triathlon, it's in my blood. I love it. It's the greatest sport in the world".

At the 2018 Commonwealth Games, Gold Coast, Queensland, he won the bronze medal in the men's PWTC despite crashing in the hand cycle leg and riding the final 8km of that leg with one pedal.

In his final major international event, at the 2018 World Championships, Gold Coast, Queensland, he finished sixth in the Men's PTWC.

Recognition
2016 – Australian Paratriathlete of the Year

References

External links
 
 International Triathlon Union profile and results
 Tri-Hard (2009), a documentary film directed by Sheraden Robins
 Bill Chaffey – Paratriathlon World Champion 2012, edited footage from the ITU World Championships race in Auckland
 Bill Chaffey talks to Karen Tighe, ABC about the debut of paratriathlon at 2016 Paralympics Games
 Bill Chaffey Interview – Rio 2016 Paralympics

1975 births
Australian male triathletes
Australian police officers
Commonwealth Games bronze medallists for Australia
Commonwealth Games medallists in triathlon
Living people
Paratriathletes of Australia
Paratriathletes at the 2016 Summer Paralympics
People from Tamworth, New South Wales
Triathletes at the 2018 Commonwealth Games
Sportsmen from New South Wales
20th-century Australian people
21st-century Australian people
Medallists at the 2018 Commonwealth Games